The Disciples of Apocalypse (DOA) were a biker-themed professional wrestling stable in the World Wrestling Federation (WWF) in the late 1990s. The group came together from the firing of Crush and Savio Vega from the Nation of Domination stable in June 1997 and consisted of four main members: Crush, Chainz, Skull and 8-Ball.

History
DOA began to form on the June 9, 1997 edition of Raw is War when, the leader of the Nation of Domination, Faarooq fired both Savio Vega and Crush from the stable. As a result, Crush proceeded to form his own Hells Angels-themed stable. The group consisted of Chainz, Skull and 8-Ball (both of whom are real-life cousins of Chainz). They were introduced on the June 23, 1997 edition of Raw is War and proceeded to feud with the new Nation of Domination led by Faarooq and Los Boricuas led by Savio Vega.

In late November 1997, Crush left the group, and the WWF in protest of the Montreal Screwjob, and believing he would fare better in WCW. The WWF addressed this by saying Crush was Kayfabe put out of action by Kane. DOA continued as a stable with Chainz assuming leadership. With the loss of Crush, DOA started to team on a semi-regular basis with Ken Shamrock and Ahmed Johnson to battle The Nation of Domination. They also feuded against the Truth Commission and their spiritual leader, The Jackyl.

During this time, DOA would make their ring entrances astride custom-made Titan Motorcycles.

As time passed, Skull and 8-Ball began to focus on their tag team career, leaving Chainz to compete as a singles wrestler. In June 1998, Chainz had his final match in the company, on an episode of Raw is War, where he lost to Val Venis.  After Chaniz left the company, Skull and 8-Ball continued as a tag team using the DOA name. They entered a feud with The Legion of Doom and Droz, during the course of which the Legion's former manager Paul Ellering turned on his former charges and sided with DOA.  However, that angle soon died out and DOA entered a brief feud with Southern Justice.  Soon after that, Ellering was beaten up and fired by the duo, after he had an argument with the duo and they formed a short lived alliance with Brian Christopher and Scott Taylor known then as Too Much. Their last match in WWF as a tag team was a loss to Ken Shamrock and Mankind on May 14, 1999 at a house show.  Soon after that match, DOA left the WWF later in May 1999. Then, both Skull and 8-Ball went to WCW.

Members

Championships and accomplishments
Wrestling Observer Newsletter awards
Worst Feud of the Year (1997) - vs. Los Boricuas

See also
Demolition
The Disciples of The New Church
The Harris Brothers
The Million Dollar Corporation
Nation of Domination
New World Order
The Stud Stable

References

External links
Profile on Online World of Wrestling

Fictional motorcycle clubs
Motorcycling in fiction
WWE teams and stables